Gilmore is an unincorporated community in Sarpy County, Nebraska, in the United States.

History
A post office was established at Gilmore in 1869, and remained in operation until it was discontinued in 1908.

An early railroad town, the community was named for a railroad official.

References

Unincorporated communities in Sarpy County, Nebraska
Unincorporated communities in Nebraska